Mokhlesur Rahman (–12 September 2016) is a Jatiya Party (Ershad) politician and the former Member of Parliament of Dinajpur-3.

Career
Rahman was elected to parliament from Dinajpur-3 as a Jatiya Party candidate in 1988.

References

Jatiya Party politicians
1940s births
4th Jatiya Sangsad members
Year of birth missing
2016 deaths